Manolis Pratikakis (born 1943) is a Greek poet. He read Medicine at the University of Athens and he is a practicing neurologist and psychiatrist. His first collection of poems was published in 1974; he belongs to the so-called Genia tou 70, which is a literary term referring to Greek authors who began publishing their work during the 1970s, especially towards the end of the Greek military junta of 1967-1974 and at the first years of the Metapolitefsi. For his collection of poems Το νερό, in 2003, he received the Greek National Book Award.

Selected poetry
Ποίηση 1971-1974 (Poetry 1971-1974), 1974
Οι παραχαράκτες (The Counterfeiters), 1976
Λιβιδώ (Libido), 1978
Η παραλοϊσμένη (The Demented), 1980
Γενεαλογία (Genealogy), 1984
Το νερό (The Water), 2002
Ποιήματα 1984-2000 (Poems 1984-2000), 2003

Notes

External links
His page at the website of the Hellenic Authors' Society (Greek)

1943 births
Living people
National and Kapodistrian University of Athens alumni
Cretan poets
People from Ierapetra